Route 77 is a state highway in southern Connecticut. It is a state-designated scenic road and runs from the Guilford town green, through North Guilford, into the town center of Durham.

Route description

Route 77 begins at an intersection with Route 146 at the Guilford town green as Whitfield Street. It runs around the west side of the green, then shifts to Church Street as it leaves the green. Route 77 crosses US 1 and I-95 (at exit 58), becoming the main road through the northern part of Guilford, past Lake Quonnipaug. Between I-95 and the Durham town line, Route 77 is known as Durham Road. Route 77 runs for another  in Durham and ends at an intersection with Route 17 just south of the town center, near the northern end of Route 79. The entire route is classified as a collector road and carries average daily traffic volumes of about 5,900 vehicles.

Route 77 is a designated state scenic road for its entire length.

History 
The road from Guilford center to Durham center was chartered as a private turnpike in 1824, known as the Guilford and Durham Turnpike. In 1922, Connecticut took over the maintenance of the main through routes and State Highway 112 was established, incorporating the old turnpike alignment from Guilford to Durham and extending north beyond Durham into Middletown (along modern Route 17). In the 1932 state highway renumbering, Route 77 was created from the portion of old Highway 112 south of Durham center. The portion north of Durham center became part of Route 15 (now Route 17). The original Route 77 ended at US 1. It was extended south to Route 146 in 1962.

Junction list

References

External links

077
Transportation in Middlesex County, Connecticut
Transportation in New Haven County, Connecticut